Dinu Sănmărtean (born 28 July 1981) is a former Romanian footballer. His previous club was Gloria Bistrița. His older brother, Lucian, was the Romanian Footballer of the Year in 2014.

Honours
FC Vaslui
Cupa României Runner-up: 2010

References

External links
 
 

1981 births
Living people
Romanian footballers
ACF Gloria Bistrița players
FC Politehnica Iași (1945) players
FC Bihor Oradea players
FC Vaslui players
Liga I players
FC Delta Dobrogea Tulcea players
AFC Dacia Unirea Brăila players
CSM Deva players
Liga II players
Association football defenders